Universidade Jean Piaget de Angola (Jean Piaget University of Angola) is a university in based in Luanda, Angola, with campuses in the Benguela province. It is named after the Swiss philosopher Jean Piaget.

History 
The university was founded in 1999.

As of 2005, the university had 815 enrolled students and is one of seven state recognized universities, both private and public, in the country.

Faculties offered
It currently offers the following faculties: 
Law
Economics and Management
Computer sciences
Sociology
Civil engineering
Nursing
 Medicine
 Electromec engineering
 Petroleum sciences
The university currently has 17 undergraduate and 5 postgraduate courses.

Planned expansion
An estimated 8 million USD are planned to be spent in an upcoming university expansion project that will add four buildings with three floors each, in an area of 35 hectares to accommodate 2,500 students.

See also
 Jean Piaget University of Cape Verde

External links
 Report on Angolan universities
 Encarta article highlighting Angolan universities (Archived 2009-10-31)
 University of Jean Piaget in Cape Verde

References

Nursing schools in Angola
Universities in Angola
Schools in Luanda

1999 establishments in Angola
Educational institutions established in 1999